Garreg Lwyd, also known as Moel Gornach, is a peak in the Black Mountain of the Brecon Beacons, South Wales. It is a subsidiary summit of Fan Brycheiniog.

It is the westernmost area over 2,000 feet above sea level in South Wales. Although no marked path crosses the mountain, it may be climbed from the car parks on the A4069 between Brynamman and Llangadog. A cairn with a trig point marks the summit.

External links
 www.geograph.co.uk : photos of Garreg Lwyd and surrounding area

References 

Black Mountain (hill)
Mountains and hills of Carmarthenshire
Hewitts of Wales
Nuttalls